Mount Stogu is a protected area (nature reserve IUCN category IV) situated in the administrative territory of Băile Olăneşti, in Vâlcea County within east Romania.

Description 
Mounth Stogu with an area of 10 ha was declared natural protected area by the Law Number. 5 of March 6, 2000 and represents a mountainous area and with diversified landforms, with flora and fauna specific Southern Carpathians.

Flora and fauna

Flora 
Vegetation of forest consists of: European beech (Fagus sylvatica), English oak (Quercus robur), European ash (Fraxinus), fir (Abies), Norway spruce (Picea abies), pine (Pinus) and the species of shrubs. 

Species of grass: lady's slipper (Cypripedium calceolus), ligularia (Ligularia sibirica), bellflower of mountain (Campanula alpina), yellow monkshood (Aconitum antthora), belladonna (Atropa belladonna), rustyback (Asplenium ceterach), windflower (Anemone nemorosa), yellow anemone (Anemone ranunculoides), common moonwort (Botrychium lunaria), ivy white (Daphne blagayana), crown vetch (Coronilla varia).

Fauna 

Species of mammals: brown bear (Ursus arctos), deer (Cervus elaphus), roe deer (Capreolus capreolus), gray wolf (Canis lupus), wild boar (Sus scrofa), lynx (lynx lynx), fox (vulpes vulpes), pine marten (Martes martes), squirrel (Sciurus carolinensis), alpine shrew (Sorex alpinus), brown long-eared bat (Plecotus auritus), lesser mouse-eared bat (Myotis blythii), barbastelle (Barbastella barbastellus);

Species of birds: western capercaillie (Tetrao urogallus), rock bunting (Emberiza cia), white-crowned wheatear (Oenanthe leucopyga), lesser spotted eagle (Aquila pomarina), wallcreeper (Tichodroma muraria), hoopoe (Upupa epops).

References

Images gallery 

Stogu
Protected areas of Romania
Geography of Vâlcea County
Protected areas established in 2000
Tourist attractions in Vâlcea County